The Ford C6 is a heavy-duty automatic transmission built by Ford Motor Company between 1966 and 1996. It was marketed as the "SelectShift Cruise-O-Matic". Compared to its predecessor MX transmission, the C6 offered lower weight, less complexity, less parasitic power loss, and greater torque capacity for larger engines. It did this without exceeding the packaging dimensions of the MX. These design goals were in line with those of the C4 for smaller engines. It was given the name "SelectShift" because if the transmission was placed in first or second gear, the transmission would use only the gear selected (i.e. would immediately activate that gear rather than initiating a sequence of shifts to arrive at it), whether from a standing stop or in motion. This was very helpful when driving in limited traction situations, where the torque of the engine would gradually move the vehicle, or if engine braking was needed on a downward incline. Once the transmission was placed in third, all three gears would be used in a normal fashion.

Design
To cut down on weight and cost, the C6 featured a simple, three speed Simpson planetary gearset. To aid in shift quality and long term durability, it was the first automatic transmission designed to use the Borg-Warner flexible shift band. It had disc clutch plates instead of bands on the low and reverse gears. It got new composite plates and valving. This gave it the capability to handle 475 ft-lb of torque. 

The C6 was used in trucks and cars with larger engines. Five different bell housing varieties exist for use with various Ford engine families: 
  The Windsor pattern was used on the 300 I6, the Ford Windsor engines and the 351 Cleveland.
 The 460 pattern was used on the 351M and 400 and all of the Ford "385" engines.
  The FE pattern was used on the FE engines
  The rare 66 - 68 Lincoln MEL 462 pattern which was used on 66 - 68 Lincoln Continentals with the 462 engine and also on 68 - 69 Lincoln Continentals with the 460. This pattern rounds off on the passenger side to clear the heat/AC box on the 66 - 69 Lincoln firewall.
  Diesel pattern.  This was similar to the FE/"385" pattern but the two are not interchangeable.

The transmission is very popular in the sport of drag racing today, with units equipped with manual valve bodies and transbrakes, some of which are air shifted.  It is also widely used in off-road applications due to its reputation of being nearly indestructible.  It does, however, have a reputation of greatly reducing performance as well as fuel mileage, due to the amount of power it requires to operate.

Applications:
 1978–1991 Ford Bronco
 1967–1996 Ford F-Series
 1964–1970 Ford Fairlane
 1966-1974 Ford Galaxie
 1966–1980 Ford LTD
 1977–1979 Ford LTD II
 1966–1979 Ford Ranchero
 1966–1979 Ford Thunderbird
 1968–1976 Ford Torino
 1966–1979 Lincolns
 1966–1969 Mercury Comet
 1967–1973 Ford Mustang
 1967–1978 Mercury Cougar
 1966–1972 Mercury Meteor
 1968–1976 Mercury Montego
 1968–1974 Mercury Monterey

E4OD
The C6 core components were used to build Ford's first electronically controlled automatic transmission. The E4OD was introduced in 1989 and used in both light and heavy duty applications. The E4OD has four forward speeds and electronic shift controls replacing the hydraulic governor control mechanism of the C6. The valve body was completely redesigned from the C6. The E4OD also has an additional planetary gear set to add 4th gear and a lockup clutch in the torque converter.

Applications:
 1990–1996 Ford Bronco
 1989–1998 Ford E-Series
 1997–1998 Ford Expedition
 1989–1998 Ford F-Series
 1993–1995 SVT Lightning

4R100
The E4OD was updated in 1998 and this new transmission was the last rendition of the C6. It was largely the same as the E4OD, but with some changes to internal components to address durability concerns when put behind increasingly powerful versions of the Powerstroke Diesel Engine. In 1999 it was fitted with a PTO for auxiliary equipment attached to heavy duty trucks.  To follow Ford's new naming schemes for its other transmissions, Ford renamed the E4OD the 4R100. 

Applications:
 1999–2004 Ford Lightning (F-150 SVT)
 2002–2003 Ford F-150 Harley-Davidson Edition
 1999–2003 Ford F-150 7700 Series (LEV - Low Emissions Vehicles only)
 1999–2003 Ford Super Duty
 1999–2003 Ford Expedition (with 5.4 V-8)
 2000–2003 Ford Excursion
 1997–2004 Ford E-Series
 2002 Lincoln Blackwood
 1998–2004 Lincoln Navigator

See also
 List of Ford transmissions

References

C6